Fetal abduction refers to the rare crime of child abduction by kidnapping of an at term pregnant woman and extraction of her fetus through a crude cesarean section. Dr. Michael H. Stone and Dr. Gary Brucato have alternatively referred to this crime as "fetus-snatching" or "fetus abduction." Homicide expert Vernon J. Geberth has used the term "fetal kidnapping." In the small number of reported cases, a few pregnant victims and about half of their fetuses survived the assault and non-medically performed cesarean.

Fetal abduction does not refer to medically induced labor or obstetrical extraction. The definition of the subject does not include compulsory cesarean sections for medical reasons nor child removal from parents for court-approved child protection. However, the "Children of the Disappeared" (desaparecidos) in the Argentine Dirty War are an example of criminal fetal abduction in state institutions as detailed by testimonies on cesarean delivery on desaparecidas and child adoption in a military hospital. Historical cases cesarean extraction for fetal murder (not for child adoption) fall outside the subject definition.

Abductor profile
Fetal abduction is mostly perpetrated by women, usually after organized planning. The abductor may befriend the pregnant victim. In some cases, the abductor impersonates a pregnant and later a puerperal mother, using weight gain and a prosthesis to fake a pregnancy and cutting of the reproductive organs to replicate injuries gained during birth. Some abductors then take the neonate to a hospital. The National Center for Missing and Exploited Children’s spokesperson, Cathy Nahirny, stated in 2007, “Many times the abductor fakes a pregnancy and when it is time to deliver the baby, must abduct someone else's child”. Criminal motives include delusions of fulfilling a partner relationship, child-bearing and childbirth.

Statistics
The National Center for Missing and Exploited Children recorded 18 cases of fetal abductions in the United States between 1983 and 2015, which represented 6% of the recorded 302 cases of infant abduction.

List of reported cases and attempts
Of the current list of 25 reported cases (not including attempts), 4 of the mothers and 13 of their fetuses survived. (This list distinguishes an attempted fetal abduction as without either murder of the mother or extraction of the fetus. An attempt can include severe injury to the mother and fetus.)

Fetal abduction cases

1987
 In Albuquerque, New Mexico, Cindy Ray was eight months pregnant when she was kidnapped at Kirtland Air Force Base outside a prenatal clinic. Darci Pierce was nineteen years old when she strangled the pregnant woman to death. She used her car keys to open Ray's womb, snatching the unharmed fetus, Amelia Monik. Amelia Monik survived, and Pierce was sentenced to 30 years to life for her crime.

1995
 In Addison, Illinois, Debra Evans was murdered in her apartment. Jacqueline Williams, her boyfriend Fedell Caffey and her cousin Lavern Ward went into Evans' home and shot her in the head. She had three children and was pregnant with a fourth. Two of Evans' children were murdered along with their mother. Evans' murderers then proceeded to cut through her womb with scissors and remove the fetus. One of the children, a baby boy, survived, as did the fetus. The three murderers were caught and sentenced to life in prison.

1996
 In Tuscaloosa, Alabama, seventeen-year-old Carethia Curry was murdered by her friend, 29-year-old Felicia Scott. Curry was abducted by her friend on a night out. She was found three months later, stuffed in a garbage can at the bottom of a fifty-foot ravine with several gunshot wounds to the head, her torso sliced open. The baby girl Curry was carrying survived, and Scott was jailed for life.

1998
 In Fresno, California, Margarita Flores was eight months pregnant when she received a phone call from Josephina Saldana, who offered her gifts of baby furniture and a free one-year supply of diapers. Flores went to a warehouse to collect them and was murdered. Saldana was caught at a hospital the day afterwards carrying a dead fetus that she claimed to have just given birth to. Saldana committed suicide three days after her conviction for kidnapping and murdering Flores and her unborn child and three weeks before her sentencing to life imprisonment.

2000
 In Ravenna, Ohio, Theresa Andrews was twenty-three years old and pregnant when she ran into Michelle Bica. Bica was thirty-nine-years-old and was pretending to be pregnant at the time, and the two exchanged addresses. Then Bica started stalking Andrews. On September 27, 2000, Bica invited the woman to her home, then killed her, extracted the fetus she was carrying, and buried the woman in her garage. The baby survived, and Bica claimed he was her son. When Bica was being investigated by the FBI, she became fearful of punishment for her crime and shot herself.

2003
 In Okemah, Oklahoma, Carolyn Simpson was twenty-one years old and six months pregnant when she was shot and killed. She worked at a casino, where her murderer, Effie Goodson, age thirty-seven, was a regular customer. Goodson offered to give Simpson a ride home, and Simpson was later found in a ditch two miles away from her abductor. The baby, removed from the mother's womb three months premature, did not survive. When Goodson brought the fetus to the hospital, the child was pronounced dead, and it was discovered that she was not the mother. Goodson was found unable to stand for a trial, and three years later was sentenced to life in prison.

2004
 In Girardot (Cundinamarca), Colombia in April 2004, a case was reported in which both the mother and child survived. (Aseneth Piedrahita drugged Sol Angela Cartagena Bernal and extracted her fetus. Reportedly the perpetrator had medical knowledge.)
 In Skidmore, Missouri, Bobbie Jo Stinnett died of strangulation at the age of twenty-three at the hands of thirty-seven-year-old Lisa M. Montgomery. The two had been in contact previously; they were both rat terrier breeders in a dog show circuit. Montgomery had even e-mailed the victim, telling her that she wished to purchase one of her dogs. Montgomery faked a pregnancy, and on December 16, she drove from her Kansas home to Skidmore, Missouri. After strangling Stinnett to death, Montgomery cut open her abdomen and took her one-month-premature daughter. An hour later, the victim's mother found her body, and less than twenty-four hours later Victoria Jo Stinnett, the victim's stolen fetus, was found healthy in Melvern, Kansas. Lisa Montgomery was incarcerated, and a jury subsequently sentenced Montgomery, 43, to death. Montgomery was executed by lethal injection on January 13, 2021, at the United States Penitentiary in Terre Haute, Indiana.

2006
 In East St. Louis, Illinois on September 15, 2006, the pregnant Jimella Tunstall was murdered by her childhood friend Tiffany Hall. She was knocked unconscious and her unborn baby was cut from her abdomen with a pair of scissors. Neither survived the attack. Tunstall's body was left in a vacant lot. Hall also drowned Tunstall's three children, ages one, two, and seven, and left their bodies in the washer and dryer machines in the family's apartment. Hall was sentenced to life in prison in June 2008.

2008
 In Kennewick, Washington, Araceli Camacho Gomez, age twenty-seven, was stabbed to death by twenty-three-year-old Phiengchai Sisouvanh Synhavong. Gomez's hands and feet were bound with yarn throughout the attack, and her fetus was cut from her womb with a box cutter. The child survived the vicious attack. Synhavong called the police for help and attempted to pass the fetus off as her own. It quickly became apparent to authorities that she was lying and guilty of the crime.
 In Wilkinsburg, Pennsylvania, pregnant eighteen-year-old Kia Johnson was murdered during a fetal abduction by Andrea Curry-Demus, who had previously spent eight years in prison for stabbing another expectant mother to obtain her unborn baby. Curry-Demus had also seized a child from a hospital. Johnson's body was later found in Curry-Demus' apartment. The baby survived.

2009
 In Worcester, Massachusetts, Julie A. Corey, 35, murdered Darlene Haynes, 23, and extracted her fetus. The baby, Sheila Marie survived. Corey was convicted by jury and sentenced to life imprisonment in February 2014.
 In Portland, Oregon, Korena Elaine Roberts, 29, murdered pregnant Heather Megan Snively, 21, before cutting the fetus out of Snively's uterus. Roberts had been faking a pregnancy to her boyfriend and family, claiming she was expecting twins. She posted advertisements for baby items on Craigslist, and after multiple attempts to meet with other pregnant women fell through, she was able to lure Snively to her Beaverton-area home where she lived with her boyfriend and her two children on June 5, 2009. She then murdered Snively in the bathroom and cut the fetus, a baby boy, out of Snively's uterus. After covering Snively's body in carpet and hiding it in a crawlspace beneath the house, Roberts called her boyfriend, Yan Shubin, claiming she needed help delivering her baby. He came home to find Roberts in the bathtub with the water running, crying uncontrollably and holding the baby boy, who was not breathing. Paramedics took Roberts and the baby to the hospital, where doctors determined that Roberts had not given birth. Hospital staff called police, who arrested Roberts and located Snively's body in Roberts' home that night. The baby boy could not be revived and was pronounced dead at the hospital. An autopsy showed that Snively suffered between 15 and 30 blows, mostly to the back of her head, as well as multiple cuts to her right breast and abdomen, and bite marks on her right arm. The medical examiner was able to determine that while the head injuries likely knocked Snively unconscious, it was the abdominal incisions and blood loss that killed her. Roberts pleaded guilty to one count of aggravated murder and agreed to life in prison without the possibility of parole.

2011
 In Bowling Green, Kentucky, Kathy Coy cut out Jamie Stice's fetus and left Stice to bleed to death on a rural road. Coy initially claimed she'd given birth to the baby five weeks premature, but doctors determined that the baby wasn't hers. Police found that Coy was friends on Facebook with Stice and another pregnant woman. The other woman was unharmed, but police grew suspicious when they couldn't find Stice. After intense questioning, Coy led police to Stice's body. Coy pleaded guilty but mentally ill to avoid the death penalty. In March 2012, she was sentenced to life imprisonment.
 In Milwaukee, Wisconsin, Annette Morales-Rodriguez kidnapped Martiza Ramirez-Cruz, beat her to death and cut her fetus out of the womb. The fetus was just days away from being due. According to a criminal complaint, Morales-Rodriguez called police hours later to report that she'd just given birth in her shower and the baby wasn't breathing. The fetus was pronounced dead, and an autopsy determined the baby did not belong to Morales-Rodriguez.
 In Oakdale, Louisiana, Pamela Causey-Fregia killed pregnant Victoria Marie Perez with blunt force trauma. Causey tried to convince her husband, who was leaving her, that she was pregnant, despite her family believing she had a hysterectomy. She burned the body and buried it on her property. Causey's young children witnessed the murder and alerted police in 2015. In March 2018 Causey-Fregia pled guilty to murder and was sentenced to life imprisonment.

2013
 In Mogale City, South Africa in January 2013, Loretta Cooke extracted the fetus of Valencia Behrens. The mother was found dead, the fetus survived.
 In Johannesburg, South Africa on July 31, 2013, Zandile Makulana extracted Pretty Tsanga's fetus. Neither the mother nor her fetus survived.

2015
 In Longmont, Colorado, 34-year-old Dynel Lane posted a Craigslist ad advertising free maternity clothes. When the seven months pregnant 26-year-old Michelle Wilkins responded to the ad, Lane broke a lava lamp over her head and stabbed her in the neck with glass from the broken lamp, before removing the fetus from her body. According to police reports, Lane's husband got home and she claimed to have had a miscarriage. Her husband found the baby in the bath tub, rolled her over and saw her gasping for air; he then took both Lane and the baby to the hospital. The baby was actually dead or died within minutes. Wilkins survived the attack and while in Lane's basement she was able to lock the door, call 911, and get medical assistance. On April 29, 2016 Lane was sentenced to 100 years imprisonment. According to Colorado law, no homicide charge was brought as the mother survived and the neonate was found to have been not viable. Wilkins named the child, a girl, Aurora and was reunited with her in the hospital, though the reunification took place after Aurora had been pronounced dead. The September 14, 2015 episode of the Dr. Phil interview of Michelle details Michelle's story as of then.
 In Bronx, New York City, Ashleigh Wade, 22, was accused of killing Angelikque Sutton, 22, and taking her baby who survived.

2017
 In Fargo, North Dakota, William Hoehn (32 years old) and Brooke Crews (38) were charged on August 28, 2017 with conspiring to kidnap and murder pregnant Savanna Greywind (22) and to kidnap her baby. Greywind's body was found in the river 8 days after she disappeared on August 19. The newborn, named Haisley Jo, survived. Crews pled guilty and said Greywind was still alive when she performed the cesarean on her.

2019
A nine-month pregnant 19-year-old Chicago woman, Marlen Ochoa-Lopez (surname alternately given as Ochoa-Uriostegui in some reporting), was lured to a house with the promise of free baby clothes on April 23, and then strangled. Police believe that "the baby was forcibly removed following that murder" and a 46-year-old woman living at the residence subsequently called emergency services and stated that she had just given birth to the infant. The baby boy was stated to be in critical condition then. The deceased mother's body was found on the property on May 15. The boy, named Yovanny Jadiel Lopez, died several weeks later from brain damage. Clarisa Figueroa and her daughter, Desiree Figueroa were charged with first degree murder among other counts, Clarisa's husband Piotr Bobak was charged with associated crimes.

2020
 On August 28, Flavia Godinho Mafra was 8 months and 2 weeks pregnant, she was lured to a fake baby shower in Santa Catarina, Brazil. She was later found dead due to cuts from her abdomen due to her baby being removed, and from being struck with a brick. A 26-year-old suspect was arrested in connection with the murder, the woman had suffered a miscarriage in January but continued lying to everyone about still being pregnant. The baby survived the incident.
21 year old Reagan Simmons-Hancock, who was 8 months pregnant, was killed on October 9 in New Boston, Texas. Her baby was cut from her body. Taylor Parker, who claimed to only know Hancock by her first name, had been the photographer at Hancock’s wedding the year before and had spent time with Hancock the week of the murder going out for a “girl’s day” and visited Hancock and her husband’s home the night before telling them she was to be induced the following day - the day the murders occurred. Parker was later arrested in Oklahoma in connection with the case. She was convicted of Hancock's murder in October 2022. She was sentenced to death in November 2022.

Fetal abduction attempts

2009
 In Washington, DC in December 2009, Teka Adams, 29 years old, homeless and nine months pregnant, was abducted by acquaintance Veronica Deramous, aged 40. Deramous enlisted the help of her seventeen-year-old son to tie up Adams and hold her captive for four days. During those four days, Deramous unsuccessfully attempted to extract the fetus. Adams was able to escape, barely clinging to life and severely injured. A neighbor called 911, and both Adams and her fetus survived. The cesarean was completed at a hospital and the baby was named Miracle. In November 2010 Veronica Deramous was sentenced to 25 years imprisonment on a plea bargain for first-degree assault.

See also 
 À l'intérieur (Inside), a 2007 French horror film about a pregnant woman who is attacked by a sadistic woman who wants her unborn child.
 Slasher, a 2016 anthology horror television series, is based upon the murder of a husband and wife, whose baby was removed via live caesarean section, before being abducted by the killer.

References

Further reading 

 Fetal Attraction: a Descriptive Study of Patterns in Fetal Abductions
 Report: Fetal abduction cases on the rise

Crimes
Child abduction
Childbirth